Bad Brains are an American hardcore punk band formed in Washington, D.C. in 1976. Originally a jazz fusion band under the name Mind Power, they are widely regarded as pioneers of hardcore punk, though the band's members have objected to the use of this term to describe their music. They are also an adept reggae band, while later recordings featured elements of other genres like no wave, funk, heavy metal, hip hop, reggae and soul. Rolling Stone magazine called them "the mother of all black hard-rock bands", and they have been cited as a seminal influence to numerous subgenres of heavy metal, including thrash/speed metal, alternative metal, funk metal and rap/nu metal. Bad Brains are followers of the Rastafari movement.

Bad Brains have released nine studio albums. They have broken up and reformed several times over their career, sometimes with different singers or drummers. Their classic lineup includes singer H.R., guitarist Dr. Know, bassist Darryl Jenifer, and drummer Earl Hudson. This lineup was intact until 1987 and has reunited periodically in the years since.

Many notable bands and artists cite Bad Brains as an artistic influence on their music, including the Beastie Boys, Nirvana, Foo Fighters, Guns N' Roses, Soundgarden, the Red Hot Chili Peppers, Jane's Addiction, Faith No More, Rage Against the Machine, Deftones, Clutch, Green Day, the Offspring, the Roots, Lamb of God, No Doubt, Anthrax, Living Colour, Fishbone, Sublime and countless other bands.

History

Formation and early years (1976–1985) 
The band's origins date to 1976, when the members first came together as a jazz fusion band called Mind Power, in the mold of bands such as Return to Forever and Mahavishnu Orchestra. The group included lead guitarist Dr. Know (Gary Miller), bassist Darryl Jenifer, and brothers Paul Hudson (later known as H.R.) on rhythm guitar and Earl Hudson on drums.

In 1977, the band's friend Sid McCray introduced them to punk rock. Mind Power decided to switch their sound to hardcore punk and changed their name to Bad Brains, after the Ramones song "Bad Brain." Despite their burgeoning punk sound, after seeing Bob Marley in concert the band also became interested in reggae music and the Rastafari movement. McCray was briefly the singer for the new hardcore punk incarnation of the band, but he soon departed, and H.R. switched from guitar to lead vocals.

The band gained a fan base in Washington D.C. due to their high-energy performances and occasional reggae songs. In 1979 they were blacklisted from many Washington area clubs due to their destructive fans; this was later addressed in their song "Banned in D.C.". By 1980 the band relocated to New York City, where they would serve as a catalyst for that city's burgeoning hardcore scene. 

By 1982, they were a regular act at the New York venue CBGB. Dr. Know recalled, "We played CB's every friggin' night. This whole 'Sunday matinee' thing is from us. When we first played, nobody was there. It's like, 'Who are these niggers?' And we're in their face, killing it. We got a weekend day, and by then a little buzz started happening." Their self-titled debut album was released on the ROIR label, originally on cassette only, in 1982, followed in 1983 by Rock for Light, produced by Ric Ocasek of The Cars. In 1985, the Bad Brains song "Pay to Cum" was featured in Martin Scorsese's film After Hours.

Stylistic expansion and line-up changes (1986–1994)
In 1986, Bad Brains signed with SST Records and released I Against I. In addition to the band's hardcore punk and reggae sounds, this album added elements from heavy metal and funk. H.R. provided the vocals for the song "Sacred Love" over the phone from the Lorton Reformatory while serving time for a cannabis charge. H.R. gained additional critical notice for his expanded vocal style on I Against I; according to Rick Anderson of AllMusic, "[HR] digs deep into his bag of voices and pulls them all out, one by one: the frightening nasal falsetto that was his signature in the band's hardcore days, an almost bel canto baritone, and a declamatory speed-rap chatter that spews lyrics with the mechanical precision of a machine gun". 
H.R. and Earl Hudson quit the band in 1987 to focus on reggae music. Touring for I Against I was completed with singer Taj Singleton and former Cro-Mags drummer Mackie Jayson. In 1988, Bad Brains signed with Caroline Records and began recording the album Quickness. The album was recorded with Singleton and Jayson, but the Hudson brothers returned to the band in 1989 and H.R. replaced Singleton's work with new lyrics and vocals.

During this period, the Hudson brothers, who wanted to steer the band toward reggae, often clashed with Dr. Know and Jenifer, who were increasingly interested in hard rock and heavy metal. H.R. often failed to turn up for scheduled concerts and recording sessions. After the tour supporting Quickness ended in 1989, the Hudson brothers again quit the band. Mackie Jayson again joined on drums. Former Faith No More member Chuck Mosley took over on lead vocals in 1990–91, and was then replaced by Israel Joseph I (Dexter Pinto). In 1990 the band collaborated with Henry Rollins on a cover of The MC5's "Kick Out the Jams", which appears on the soundtrack to the film Pump Up the Volume.

As bands influenced by Bad Brains (such as Living Colour and Fishbone) enjoyed commercial success, Epic Records approached Dr. Know in 1992 and offered the band their first major-label record deal. The album Rise was released by Epic in 1993. Jayson left the band in the middle of the ensuing tour and was temporarily replaced by Chuck Treece.

Original line-up reunions and name change (1994–2004)
The Hudson brothers again returned to the band in 1994, and they signed with Maverick Records for the 1995 album God of Love. In support of the album, Bad Brains opened for the Beastie Boys on the Ill Communication tour, and headlined a U.S. tour with the then-unknown Deftones. However, the reunion did not last for long, because of H.R.'s erratic behavior while performing and several violent incidents against the band's manager, fans, and venue employees. H.R. landed in jail and the band broke up once again.

In 1997 Bad Brains reconvened to remaster some early recordings, which were released as the EP The Omega Sessions. From 1998 to 2001, the original lineup toured under the name Soul Brains and released two live albums.

Build a Nation and Into the Future (2005–2015)

In 2005 the band, known once again as Bad Brains, announced that they were recording their first album of new material in ten years, with MCA of the Beastie Boys producing. They played their first shows in several years at CBGB in 2006. Build a Nation was released in 2007. The band toured extensively in 2007–08, with former singer Israel Joseph I filling in for H.R. on some dates. Daryl Jenifer released the solo album In Search of Black Judas in 2010. A short Bad Brains tour of Australia planned for 2010 was cancelled due to health reasons.

Bad Brains announced the recording of another new album in 2011. Into the Future was released in late 2012, and included a tribute to the recently deceased MCA. On the ensuing tour, the band added touring keyboardist Jamie Saft. In 2014 the band hinted at another new album, though no such album has yet been released. Also in 2014, author Greg Prato released the book Punk! Hardcore! Reggae! PMA! Bad Brains! which recounted the band's history. In 2015 the band recorded the live EP The Woodstock Sessions; H.R. did not participate for undisclosed reasons and was replaced by Jamaican singer Jesse Royal. H.R.'s status at the band remained unclear throughout that year.

Recent developments (2015–present)
In November 2015, Dr. Know suffered a heart attack and was placed on life support due to the risk of organ failure. After three months in the hospital he made a full recovery, thanks in part to a GoFundMe campaign organized by his bandmates. In March 2016, H.R. announced that he had been diagnosed with a rare type of headache called SUNCT, and received treatment for this condition and other ongoing health issues thanks to another GoFundMe campaign.

In October 2016, Bad Brains were nominated for the Rock and Roll Hall of Fame, but were not inducted. In a December 2016 interview with Rolling Stone, Dr. Know and Darryl Jenifer discussed the band members' health issues and the future of the band. They announced that they hoped to record a new album titled Mind Power, after the band's short-lived original moniker. In June 2017 the band played a show featuring guest appearances by Randy Blythe and original Bad Brains singer Sid McCray, who sang with the band for the first time in 39 years.

Singer Chuck Mosley, who had played with Bad Brains in the early 1990s, died in November 2017. Sid McCray died in September 2020.

Band members

Current members
 Dr. Know – lead guitar (1976–1995, 1998–present)
 Darryl Jenifer – bass (1976–1995, 1998–present)
 H.R. – vocals, occasional rhythm guitar (1976–1987, 1989–1990, 1994–1995, 1998–present)
 Earl Hudson – drums (1976–1987, 1989–1990, 1994–1995, 1998–present)

Former members
 Sid McCray – vocals (1977–1978; died 2020)
 Mackie Jayson – drums (1988–1989, 1990–1993)
 Taj Singleton – vocals (1988–1989)
 Chuck Mosley – vocals (1990–1991; died 2017)
 Israel Joseph I – vocals (1991–1994, 2008)
 Chuck Treece – drums (1994)
 Jesse Royal – vocals (2015)

Timeline

Discography

 Bad Brains (1982)
 Rock for Light (1983)
 I Against I (1986)
 Quickness (1989)
 Rise (1993)
 God of Love (1995)
 I & I Survived (2002)
 Build a Nation (2007)
 Into the Future (2012)

References

External links
 Bad Brains' Myspace
 Official website
 
 
 Bad Brains at ROIR

 
1976 establishments in Washington, D.C.
African-American heavy metal musical groups
African-American hard rock musical groups
Alternative Tentacles artists
American Rastafarians
Caroline Records artists
Hardcore punk groups from Washington, D.C.
Heavy metal musical groups from Washington, D.C.
Maverick Records artists
Megaforce Records artists
Musical groups established in 1977
Musical groups disestablished in 1995
Musical groups reestablished in 1998
Musical quartets
ROIR artists
Reggae metal musical groups
Reggae rock groups
Sibling musical groups
SST Records artists
Victory Records artists